Steven Stamkos (born February 7, 1990) is a Canadian professional ice hockey centre and captain of the Tampa Bay Lightning of the National Hockey League (NHL). Stamkos was selected first overall in the 2008 NHL Entry Draft by the Lightning. He is a two-time Maurice "Rocket" Richard Trophy winner as the NHL's leading goal-scorer (2010 and 2012), is a two-time NHL second team All-Star (2011, 2012), and has been named to seven NHL All-Star Games. Nicknamed "Stammer", he has scored the most goals and the most points of any player born in the 1990s decade. Stamkos captained the Lightning to back-to-back Stanley Cup championships in 2020 and 2021.

Early life
Stamkos is of Macedonian and Scottish descent. He grew up in Unionville, Ontario, and played for the Markham Waxers in the Eastern AAA Hockey League of the Ontario Minor Hockey Association (OMHA). During one of his seasons with the North York Canadiens, he was teammates with NHLer P. K. Subban. Stamkos won eight OMHA titles in a row in minor hockey and led his Waxers club to the OHL Cup title in March 2006. He played in the 2003 Quebec International Pee-Wee Hockey Tournament with the Markham Waxers.

Stamkos attended Central Park Public School and St. Brother André Catholic High School in Markham, Ontario. After being drafted by the OHL's Sarnia Sting, he attended Northern Collegiate Institute and Vocational School in Sarnia.

Playing career

Junior
Following a season with the minor Waxers in which he scored 197 points over 66 games, Stamkos was selected first overall in the 2006 OHL Draft by the Sarnia Sting. Stamkos played with other notable current and former NHLers in his minor and junior hockey career, including Logan Couture, John Tavares, Michael Del Zotto, Cameron Gaunce, Cody Hodgson, and P. K. Subban during his minor hockey career in the Greater Toronto Area. Joining the Sting in 2006–07, he recorded 92 points (42 goals and 50 assists) over 63 games as a junior rookie. He was named to the OHL Second All-Rookie Team, ranking behind Sam Gagner at the center position. Stamkos also won the Bobby Smith Trophy as the OHL's scholastic player of the year for his academic efforts off the ice.

The following season, Stamkos improved to 58 goals and 105 points over 61 games. He was named to the OHL second All-Star team, but was later selected to the CHL first All-Star team, which encompasses all three national major junior leagues. Playing in his NHL draft-eligible season in 2007–08, Stamkos was top-ranked throughout the campaign by the NHL Central Scouting Bureau and International Scouting Services. He also won the CHL's Top Draft Prospect Award.

Tampa Bay Lightning
As the 2008 NHL Entry Draft approached, Stamkos was largely seen as the best available center. His primary competition for the top overall pick was top prospect defencemen Drew Doughty and Zach Bogosian, as well as Russian winger Nikita Filatov. The Tampa Bay Lightning, by virtue of their 2007–08 campaign in which they won an NHL-worst 31 games, owned the first pick.

As expected, Stamkos was selected first overall by Tampa Bay. On July 29, 2008, he signed a three-year, entry-level contract with the Lightning in which he could earn as much as $8.55 million in performance bonuses. Leading up to the start of the 2008–09 season, the Lightning centered their promotional efforts around Stamkos, including a website with the slogan "Seen Stamkos?"

Early years, Richard Trophy wins (2008–2013) 

Stamkos played in his first NHL game in Prague, Czech Republic, at the start of the 2008–09 season. The Lightning fell to the New York Rangers 2–1 and were eventually swept in Prague. He recorded his first point — a secondary assist — in his eighth game, which was against his hometown Toronto Maple Leafs. Following the game, Stamkos commented that his hometown support was "louder than when the Leafs scored". He scored his first goal the next game against Ryan Miller of the Buffalo Sabres.

After 54 games, Stamkos recorded the first NHL hat-trick of his career, on February 17, 2009. The Lightning held a 3–1 lead midway through the second period on the strength of Stamkos' natural hat-trick, but were still beaten by the visiting Chicago Blackhawks, 5–3. The three goals enabled Stamkos to become the first rookie in Lightning history to score three goals in a game. He also became the second-youngest player in NHL history to record a natural hat-trick; current record-holder Bobby Carpenter was 18 when he scored three on February 25, 1982.

Though Stamkos was heavily criticized for his lack of production during the first half of the season, in which he was limited to less than ten minutes of ice time some games (largely due to a dispute amongst then-head coach Barry Melrose and upper management, mainly co-owner Len Barrie on how to approach the development of Stamkos in the NHL), he finished the season with 19 points in his final 20 games. In his rookie season, Stamkos totalled 23 goals and 46 points, as well as a −13 plus-minus rating.

Prior to the 2009–10 season, Stamkos spent the summer training extensively with former NHL player Gary Roberts, working on adding strength and endurance. Roberts got to know Stamkos in the 2008–09 season, his last in the NHL. He oversaw Stamkos' off-season workouts north of Toronto in Roberts' in-house gym, which is a quick drive from Stamkos' family home in Unionville. Stamkos spoke highly regarding the workouts: "It helped me a lot," Stamkos said. "I learned a lot about what I needed to improve on. There are certain aspects of my game that have improved because of that, and I'll be there again this summer working hard. It definitely gave me that extra jump for this season."

In his second year with the Lightning, Stamkos began to find his range as an NHL sharpshooter and had a breakout season. Playing the bulk of the season on a line with Martin St. Louis and Steve Downie, Stamkos started the 2009–10 campaign with 10 goals in his first 11 games. Through the months of January and February, Stamkos had an 18-game point streak. By the time he turned 20, he was in the top five in the NHL in scoring, challenging the likes of Alexander Ovechkin and Sidney Crosby.
	
On April 10, Stamkos reached the 50-goal mark for the season when he scored two goals against Tampa Bay's rivals, the Florida Panthers. He ended the season with 51 goals, tied for most in the NHL with Sidney Crosby of the Pittsburgh Penguins; the two shared the Rocket Richard Trophy as the NHL's goal-scoring leaders; he tied Crosby in the final minute of the last game of the season with an empty-net goal. Stamkos became the third-youngest player to score 50 goals in a season, after Wayne Gretzky and Jimmy Carson. His number of goals, 51, was five more than his total points amount in the previous season. Additionally, Stamkos' 44 assists gave him 95 points for the season, good for fifth place in the NHL behind Henrik Sedin, Alexander Ovechkin, Sidney Crosby and Nicklas Bäckström. However, Tampa Bay finished the year with 34 wins and 80 points. After the season, the team's poor record prompted team owner Jeffrey Vinik to terminate Brian Lawton and Rick Tocchet's contracts as general manager and head coach, respectively.

Following a high-scoring start to the 2010–11 season in which he scored 19 goals in his first 19 games, Stamkos began to attract media attention for challenging the elite "50 goals in 50 games" standard. Wayne Gretzky, who scored 50 goals in a record 39 games in 1981–82, told reporters he thought Stamkos was surrounded by enough talent in Tampa Bay to achieve the feat.

On December 20, 2010, Stamkos scored his 26th goal of the season and the 100th of his career, leading the Lightning past the Carolina Hurricanes 5–1 on a Monday night game. Stamkos had one of three Lightning goals late in the second period that put Tampa Bay ahead 5–1. The centre's milestone goal came in his 194th NHL game.

In January 2011, Stamkos was named by the NHL to play in the NHL All-Star Game. Stamkos was drafted second overall by Team Lidstrom, joining Tampa Bay teammate Martin St. Louis on the squad. However, as the season progressed it became apparent Stamkos would not achieve the 50-in-50 mark. By the 52nd game, he had recorded an NHL-leading 38 goals. Stamkos' latter portion of the season was markedly less successful; he recorded just 7 more goals in the last 30 games. Finishing with 45 goals, he ranked second in NHL scoring, behind Corey Perry of the Anaheim Ducks. His 91 points placed him fifth in the NHL for the second consecutive year.

As the Lightning ranked fifth in the Eastern Conference, Stamkos made his Stanley Cup playoff debut in 2011. On April 23, he scored his first two career playoff goals, as well an assist, in an 8–2 victory over the Pittsburgh Penguins. The Lightning advanced to the Eastern Conference Finals against the Boston Bruins. During the deciding Game 7, Stamkos took a slapshot from Bruins defenceman Johnny Boychuk to the face; the impact broke his nose and bloodied his face, forcing him to momentarily leave the game, though he eventually returned wearing a full-visored mask. The Lightning went on to lose the game 1–0, eliminating them from the playoffs. Stamkos scored below his regular-season pace with 13 points over 18 games, ranking fifth in team-scoring.

During the off-season, Stamkos became a restricted free agent on July 1, 2011. Eighteen days later, he re-signed with Tampa Bay on a five-year, $37.5 million contract.

On March 13, 2012, Stamkos scored his 50th goal of the 2011–12 season in a 6–1 win over Boston. In so doing, he became the sixth player in NHL history to record more than one 50-goal season before his 23rd birthday. He then scored his 53rd goal on March 26 against the Philadelphia Flyers, breaking Vincent Lecavalier's team record for goals in a season, set in 2006–07. Five days later, Stamkos set an NHL record by scoring his fifth overtime goal of the regular season, beating Winnipeg Jets goaltender Ondřej Pavelec from the left circle, Stamkos' "trademark" shot during his first three seasons.
 
On the final day of the regular season, Stamkos recorded his 60th goal in a 4–3 overtime win against Winnipeg, becoming the 20th player in NHL history to achieve the feat and the first since Alexander Ovechkin did so in 2007–08. Adding to his 60 goals, Stamkos recorded 37 assists for 97 points, ranking second in the NHL, 12 behind Evgeni Malkin of the Pittsburgh Penguins, who (along with Henrik Lundqvist) were named the NHL's three finalists for the Hart Memorial Trophy in April. Despite Stamkos' individual success, the Lightning struggled as a team, finishing the season out of the 2012 playoffs at tenth overall in the East.

During the 2012–13 NHL lockout, Stamkos trained with a handful of other NHL players at Gary Roberts' training academy in Ontario. The lockout also gave Stamkos an opportunity to do things in his hometown of Toronto he normally would not get to do. That included playing in his father's pick-up hockey league every Thursday night, when he and former Lightning forward Steve Downie would mix it up with a group that varied as much in age (22–65) as ability. On playing in his father's pick-up league, Stamkos said, "It was a blast, those guys loved it they don't get a chance to play with NHL guys very often." He added, "It was a lot of fun and something I'll cherish forever."

On March 1, 2013, after play resumed for the shortened 2012–13 season, Stamkos was named the NHL's First Star of the Month for February. He joined Pittsburgh captain Sidney Crosby and Chicago Blackhawks goaltender Ray Emery, who ranked as the Second and Third Stars, respectively. Stamkos had a season-high six-game goal streak and six multi-point outings, and recorded at least 1 point in 11 of 14 games last month. He ended February on an eight-game point streak (seven goals and seven assists).

On March 18, 2013, Stamkos scored his 200th career goal to give the Lightning the victory over the Philadelphia Flyers. Stamkos finished the season with 29 goals, ranking him second in the NHL behind Alexander Ovechkin's NHL-leading 32. He also had 28 assists, which gave him a total of 57 points in 48 games.

Injury-plagued seasons, rising team success (2013–2017) 
On November 11, 2013, Stamkos suffered a broken tibia in a game against the Boston Bruins. He was backchecking on a play late in the second period when he was tied up with Boston defenceman Dougie Hamilton. His left skate appeared to hit the post first before his right leg crashed into it around the shin area. He tried to get up twice before going down to the ice in pain, grabbing his leg just above the ankle. After a brief delay, a stretcher was brought out and he was taken off to loud applause. He was taken to Massachusetts General Hospital. Stamkos entered the day tied for the NHL's lead in scoring with Pittsburgh's Sidney Crosby. On November 12, 2013, Stamkos underwent successful surgery in Boston to stabilize a fracture in his right tibia, and he began rehabilitation immediately.

On November 25, 2013, Stamkos made a press appearance where he was seen walking without the use of crutches or a walking boot. He updated the media on his miraculous progress and was hopeful that he could return to the Lightning before commencement of the 2014 Winter Olympics in Sochi, which he was widely considered to play in for Canada. Ultimately, he was unable to recover in time to participate in the Olympics. However, he was cleared to play for the Lightning on March 5 – the same day former teammate Martin St. Louis was traded to the New York Rangers – and returned March 6 in a game against the Buffalo Sabres, which the team lost 3–1. Stamkos was named the new captain of the Lightning before the game, replacing the departed St. Louis.

On March 24, 2014, Stamkos played in his 400th career NHL game, scoring a power play goal to tie the game at three in an eventual 4–3 shootout loss to the Ottawa Senators.

On November 11, 2014, Stamkos recorded his 200th career NHL assist in a Lightning 3–2 shootout loss to the Chicago Blackhawks. On December 9, 2014, Stamkos reached another career milestone when he scored his 250th NHL goal. The goal came in a Tampa Bay 5–3 loss to the Washington Capitals, his 17th of the season. On May 24, 2015, during the 2015 playoffs, Stamkos scored a goal in a 2–0 Lightning victory over the New York Rangers, tying him with the Lightning playoff record for goals in consecutive games (4). After the Lightning defeated the Rangers in seven games, Stamkos and the Lightning would move on to the Stanley Cup Final where they were defeated in six games by the eventual Stanley Cup champions Chicago Blackhawks.

On October 12, 2015, Stamkos recorded his 500th career NHL point off a power-play goal against the Boston Bruins. The Lightning would go on to win the game 6–3. With his 500th career point, Stamkos became the third player in Lightning history to record over 500 points. He joined both Martin St. Louis (953) and Vincent Lecavalier (874) as the only players to do so. On October 23, 2015, Stamkos played in his 500th career NHL game in a 4–3 overtime Lightning victory over the Winnipeg Jets. On November 1, 2015, Stamkos moved into second place for the most power-play goals in Lightning history with 97. Stamkos moved from a tie with former teammate Martin St. Louis, who had 96 power-play goals in his time with the Lightning On January 6, 2016, Stamkos was selected to his fourth All-Star Game, joining teammate Ben Bishop. On February 20, 2016, Stamkos scored his 300th career NHL goal, which came in a 4-2 Lightning win over the Pittsburgh Penguins. Stamkos became the third Lightning player in franchise history to record 300 goals, joining Lecavalier (383) and St. Louis (365). During a post-game interview, Stamkos said of his feat, "[F]irst of all, it means you've been around for a while and secondly, I've been fortunate to play with a lot of good players. I've been able to be put in positions to score goals and obviously it was special coming in a big win for our team." On February 26, 2016, Stamkos played in his 553 game in Lightning history, which came in a 4–0 win over the New Jersey Devils. With the game, Stamkos surpassed Brad Richards (552) for fourth all-time in games played for the Lightning. On February 28, 2016, Stamkos recorded his 245 career assist as a member of the Lightning in a 4–1 over the Boston Bruins. The assist moved Stamkos past Václav Prospal (244) to become fourth all-time in assists with the Lightning.

On April 2, 2016, the Lightning announced Stamkos was diagnosed with thoracic outlet syndrome, the same injury that sidelined teammate Andrei Vasilevskiy at the start of the 2015–16 season; it is a condition that is rare among hockey players. Stamkos said he first felt some discomfort in his arm after the game against the Montreal Canadiens. He was scheduled for surgery on the following Monday with Dr. Karl Illig, who performed Vasilevskiy's surgery. Lightning general manager Steve Yzerman said there would be no long-term impact on Stamkos' health or his career. In addition, Yzerman indicated Stamkos recovery time would be between one and three months, but the club would have a better idea in a couple of weeks where he falls within that time frame. Yzerman also said the team's desire is for Stamkos to remain with the organization, which came after a question of whether Stamkos had played his last game in a Lightning uniform. On April 4, 2016, Stamkos had successful surgery at Tampa General Hospital. Stamkos' surgeon said they plan on evaluating him in approximately two weeks and that should clear up his prognosis. On May 26, 2016, Stamkos dressed for Game 7 of the Eastern Conference Finals against the Pittsburgh Penguins, despite still being on blood thinners following surgery. He registered five shot attempts during the game, but the Lightning lost 2–1 and were eliminated from the playoffs.

On June 29, 2016, two days before Stamkos was set to become an unrestricted free agent, the Lightning signed him to an eight-year, $68 million contract extension with an annual average value of $8.5 million. Stamkos played in 77 games with the Lightning the previous season, scoring 36 goals and 64 points, ranking first in goals and second in points for the team. General manager Steve Yzerman said of the signing, "[W]e are very appreciative of the effort and commitment that Steven and his representatives have exhibited in getting a deal done." He continued, "We are excited to have him as a cornerstone part of the team for the next eight years as we continue in the franchise's ultimate goal of winning another Stanley Cup."

On November 15, 2016, Stamkos fell and left the game, which turned out to be a torn lateral meniscus in his right knee. Steve Yzerman said there was no timetable for his return and that Stamkos would be out "indefinitely". On November 17, 2016, Stamkos headed to Vail, Colorado, to undergo arthroscopic knee surgery to repair a lateral meniscus tear The procedure he underwent was estimated to have a four-month recovery window, which would keep Stamkos out of the lineup until at least mid-March. This could translate into Stamkos missing at least 50 games. Later in the day, the Lightning announced Stamkos underwent surgery that day. As predicted, Stamkos was expected to miss approximately four months.

On February 20, 2017, Yzerman provided an update on Stamkos' rehabilitation progress. Yzerman said that Stamkos had begun light skating, and is progressing well. Yzerman further stated that the timeline is still 4–6 months for his recovery. Stamkos would be approaching the four-month recovery window in mid-March. If Stamkos needs the full six months, he would be out for the remainder of the season.

On March 29, 2017, the Lightning head coach, Jon Cooper, said that after the team's upcoming game against the Detroit Red Wings Stamkos would be considered day-to-day. Stamkos said that he was not going to put any dates on his return, however, he did say that he was very pleased and excited with how his knee was feeling. Stamkos did not return to the lineup for the Lightning that season.

Recent years, back-to-back Stanley Cup wins (2017–present) 
On October 6, 2017, Stamkos played in his first game since injuring his knee the prior season. Stamkos recorded an assist in his return, which resulted in a 5–3 Lightning win over the visiting Florida Panthers. On October 12, Stamkos scored his 112th power play goal, which tied him with Vincent Lecavalier for the most power play goals in franchise history. On October 21, Stamkos scored his 113 power play goal, against Antti Niemi of the Pittsburgh Penguins in a 7–1 Lightning win at the Amalie Arena. The goal moved Stamkos past Lecavalier for most power play goals in franchise history. During that game, Stamkos also recorded his 600th career NHL point. On October 26, Stamkos recorded a point in his 11th consecutive game to start the season. In so doing, Stamkos tied Martin St. Louis for the longest season-opening point streak in Lightning history. Stamkos' streak ended the following game. On November 2, Stamkos skated in his 600th career NHL game. The following day, Stamkos was fined $5,000 for unsportsmanlike conduct after spraying his water bottle at a referee during the previous night's game. On November 17, Stamkos scored four points in a 6–1 Lightning win over the visiting Dallas Stars. This was Stamkos' fourth four-point game, which tied Stamkos with Martin St. Louis and Vincent Lecavalier for the most four-point games in Lightning history.

On January 3, 2018, Stamkos was voted by fans to be the Atlantic Division captain at the 2018 National Hockey League All-Star Game, which was held at the Lightning's home arena, Amalie Arena. This was Stamkos' fifth NHL All-Star Game appearance, which moved him past Vincent Lecavalier for second most NHL All-Star Game appearances by a Lightning player. On January 25, 2018, Stamkos recorded his 300th career NHL assist. The milestone came in a 5–1 Lightning victory over the Philadelphia Flyers away at the Wells Fargo Center. On February 8, Stamkos recorded his 20th goal of the season, which came in a 5–2 win over the visiting Vancouver Canucks. This was Stamkos' ninth 20-goal season in franchise history, which tied him with Martin St. Louis for second-most such seasons in franchise history. On March 3, Stamkos set a new career high with a five-point game in a 7–6 Lightning shootout win over the visiting Flyers. Stamkos became the seventh Lightning player in franchise history to score five points in one game. The five-point game also gave Stamkos the most career regular season games scoring at least four points in franchise history, with 11. On March 21, Stamkos was fined $5,000 for a dangerous trip against Toronto Maple Leafs' defenceman Morgan Rielly, which occurred the previous night at Amalie Arena. On March 30, Stamkos appeared in his 663rd career NHL game, which moved him past Pavel Kubina for third-most games played in Lightning history. On May 17, Stamkos recorded his 11th career NHL playoff power-play goal in a 4-2 Lightning win over the Washington Capitals at Capital One Arena. The goal moved Stamkos past St. Louis for most playoff power-play goals in franchise history.

On October 18, 2018, Stamkos recorded his 50th career game-winning goal in a 3–1 Lightning victory over the visiting Detroit Red Wings. In so doing, Stamkos became the third player in franchise history to record at least 50 game-winning goals, joining Vincent Lecavalier (60) and Martin St. Louis (64). On December 10, Stamkos scored a power play goal to record his 700th career NHL point. He became the third player in franchise history to reach 700 career points. Stamkos was also the first player from the 2008 NHL Entry Draft to record 700 career points. That same night, Stamkos also recorded his ninth career NHL hat-trick, in so doing also surpassing Martin St. Louis (8) for most hat-tricks in Lightning history. Stamkos' record breaking night helped the Lightning beat the visiting New York Rangers 6–3. On December 20, Stamkos played in his 700th career NHL game. He scored in the second period of that game, which moved him past Martin St. Louis for second-most goals in franchise history with 366. The goal came in a 5–4 shootout win against the Calgary Flames at the Scotiabank Saddledome. For December 2018, Stamkos set the Lightning record for most goals in a single calendar month with 14.

On January 2, 2019, Stamkos was named to the 2019 NHL All-Star Game, his sixth All-Star selection, tying him with Martin St. Louis for the most in Lightning history. On March 18, Stamkos scored the 384th goal of his career to break the Lighting team record for most regular season goals. On March 25, Stamkos recorded his fifth 40-goal season and his fourth 90-point season. Stamkos tied St. Louis for the most 90-point seasons in Lightning history. On April 4, Stamkos recorded a goal and an assist giving him 97 points on the year to match his highest point total in a single season. The goal also established a new franchise record for most consecutive road games with a goal (7). On April 6, Stamkos recorded a short-handed goal to extend his road goal record to 8-games and also set a new career high in points with his 98th point.

On November 16, 2019, Stamkos recorded his 400th career NHL goal in a 3–4 loss to the Winnipeg Jets at Amalie Arena. Stamkos became the first player in Lightning history to score 400 goals with the franchise. On December 7, 2019, Stamkos recorded his 150th and 151st NHL power-play goal in a 7–1 Lightning win over the visiting San Jose Sharks at Amalie Arena. In doing so, Stamkos became the 4th player in NHL history that played primarily as a center to record 150+ career power-play goals before the age of 30. On December 28, 2019, Stamkos recorded his 800th career NHL point. Stamkos became the third player in Lightning history to record 800 points with the franchise. On January 9, 2020, Stamkos recorded his 400th career NHL assist. Stamkos became the third player in Lightning history to reach the milestone. On January 24, 2020, Stamkos was named to the NHL's 2010s All-Decade Second Team. In that decade Stamkos recorded 731 points over 672 games. On February 4, 2020, Stamkos recorded his 61st game-winning goal of his career. The goal moved him past Vincent Lecavalier for second most game-winning goals in Lightning history. On February 17, 2020, Stamkos skated in his 800th career NHL game. Stamkos joined St. Louis and Lecavalier as the only players in franchise history to play in 800 career games.

On March 2, 2020, Stamkos had surgery to repair a core muscle. Stamkos recovery was projected at 6–8 weeks from the procedure, which caused him to miss the remainder of the regular season. On September 23, 2020, Stamkos returned to the Lightning lineup in the third game of the Stanley Cup Finals where he scored on his first shot of the game. Stamkos' goal was the second time in NHL history that a player skating in their first game of the playoffs in the Stanley Cup Final scored a goal, the previous being Billy Taylor Sr. in 1940. Stamkos logged just 2:47 of ice time during the game which was his only game of the 2020 Stanley Cup playoffs. The Lightning would go on to win the Stanley Cup, marking Stamkos' first championship. 

They repeated as Stanley Cup champions in 2021.

On December 1, 2022, Stamkos recorded his 1,000th point, assisting a Nick Paul goal in a 4–1 win against the Philadelphia Flyers. He became the 95th player, the 14th first overall pick, and the first player in Lighting history to record 1000 NHL points.

On January 18, 2023, in a 5–2 win over the Vancouver Canucks, Stamkos became the first player in Lightning history to record 500 career goals, just the third active player at the time and the 47th player ever to achieve the feat. He capped off the night with a hat trick, becoming just the eighth player in NHL history to do so. He said it was "a humbling experience when you have a moment like that."

Personal life
On June 30, 2017, Stamkos married his long-time girlfriend Sandra Porzio. The ceremony was held in Toronto and was attended by several of his current and former teammates.

On October 26, 2017, the Sarnia Sting announced it was retiring Stamkos' number 91. This was done in a ceremony on January 12, 2018. Stamkos was the first player to have his jersey retired in the 23-year history of the Sting.

International play
 

Stamkos played for Canada in the 2008 World Junior Ice Hockey Championships, where he helped the team win a gold medal. After his rookie season with the Lightning, Stamkos was named to Canada's senior roster for the 2009 Men's World Ice Hockey Championships. Stamkos continued to impress at the 2009 IIHF World Championships, scoring on his first career shift and meshing with fellow Lightning forward Martin St. Louis for seven goals, 11 points and a +9 plus-minus rating en route to a 2–1 loss to Russia in the finals. He was also selected as a reserve by Canada for the 2010 Winter Olympics and scored seven goals in Canada's fifth-place finish at the 2013 World Championships. Stamkos was expected to be a major contributor for Canada in Sochi for the 2014 Winter Olympics and was named to the roster, but his injuries sustained prior to the NHL Olympic break, including a broken tibia sustained in November 2013, prevented him from participating. The NHL prohibited its players to take part in the 2018 and 2022 Winter Olympics, which prevented him from participating in those games as well.

On March 2, 2016, Hockey Canada named Stamkos to its roster for the 2016 World Cup of Hockey in Toronto. Stamkos won the tournament with Team Canada after a 2–1 win over Team Europe in Game 2 of the best-of-three series. He recorded a goal as well as an assist in the tournament, with a plus-minus rating of +3.

Endorsements
 
Following his selection into the NHL, Stamkos signed a number of sponsorships, including an athlete's agreement with Nike. He was featured in a web-only Nike commercial called Forget Everything, which was released to coincide with his first game in his hometown of Unionville on October 28, 2008. He has also endorsed Tissot watches. On June 22, 2011, Stamkos was named the cover athlete for the EA Sports' NHL 12 video game. In late 2013, he played the leading role in a web commercial for Coca-Cola Zero named "Shawn Warford's Moment Zero." Most recently, Stamkos signed a multi-year sponsorship with Sport Chek, Canada's largest sports retailer.

Career statistics

Regular season and playoffs
Bold indicates led league

International

Awards and honours

Records

Single season

Most goals in a single month by a Tampa Bay Lightning player, 14 (2018–19)
Most goals in a single season by a Tampa Bay Lightning player, 60 (2011–12)
Most overtime goals in a single season by a Tampa Bay Lightning player, 6 (2011–12)
Most power-play goals in a single season by a Tampa Bay Lightning player, 24 (2009–10)
Most game-winning goals in a single season by a Tampa Bay Lightning player, 12 (2011–12)
Most even-strength goals in a single season by a Tampa Bay Lightning player, 48 (2011–12)

Career, regular season

Most career points by a Tampa Bay Lightning player, 1022
Most career goals by a Tampa Bay Lightning player, 502
Most career hat-tricks by a Tampa Bay Lightning player, 11
Most power-play goals by a Tampa Bay Lightning player, 181
Most game winning goals by a Tampa Bay Lightning player, 73
Most even-strength goals by a Tampa Bay Lightning player, 295
Most career regular-season games with 4+ points by a Tampa Bay Lightning player, 17

See also
List of NHL players with 50-goal seasons
List of NHL players with 500 goals
List of NHL players with 100-point seasons
List of NHL players with 1,000 points

References

External links
 

1990 births
Living people
Canadian expatriate ice hockey players in the United States
Canadian ice hockey centres
Canadian people of Macedonian descent
Canadian people of Scottish descent
Ice hockey people from Ontario
National Hockey League All-Stars
National Hockey League first-overall draft picks
National Hockey League first-round draft picks
Rocket Richard Trophy winners
Sarnia Sting players
Sportspeople from Markham, Ontario
Stanley Cup champions
Tampa Bay Lightning draft picks
Tampa Bay Lightning players